Bear Creek Township, Illinois may refer to the following places:

Bear Creek Township, Christian County, Illinois
Bear Creek Township, Hancock County, Illinois

See also

Bear Creek Township (disambiguation)

Illinois township disambiguation pages